Wechiau Community Hippo Sanctuary is a community-led tourism attraction project located at Wechiau in the Upper West Region of Ghana. It is run by the local communities and is committed to protecting and conserving the Hippopotamus and its habitat along the Black Volta River in Ghana. This region is one of only two remaining hippopotamus populations left in Ghana and is vital to this species' future survival throughout West Africa

References 

Tourist attractions in Ghana